Kentucky Route 446 (KY 446) is a state highway in the city of Bowling Green in Warren County, Kentucky. The highway runs  from U.S. Route 31W, US 68, and KY 80 east to Interstate 65 (I-65). KY 446 is a four-lane divided highway that serves as a connector between the Interstate and U.S. Highways east of Bowling Green and provides access to the National Corvette Museum and the Bowling Green Assembly Plant.

Route description
KY 446 begins at a modified trumpet interchange with Louisville Road, on which US 31W, US 68, and KY 80 run concurrently, at the eastern edge of the city of Bowling Green. The junction includes a flyover from KY 446 to westbound Louisville Road and a left turn from westbound Louisville Road to KY 446. KY 446's only intermediate intersection is with Corvette Drive, which leads south to the National Corvette Museum and north to the Bowling Green Assembly Plant, where General Motors manufactures the Chevrolet Corvette. The highway reaches its eastern terminus at a trumpet interchange with I-65. The Kentucky Transportation Cabinet classifies KY 446 as a state primary highway.

Major intersections

References

0446
0446